Pag (pronounced ; ,) is a Croatian island in the northern Adriatic Sea. It is the fifth-largest island of the Croatian coast and the one with the longest coastline.

In the 2011 census, the population of the island was 9,059. There are two towns on the island, Pag and Novalja, as well as many smaller villages and tourist places. Pag is the only Croatian island that is administratively divided between two counties. Its northern part belongs to Lika-Senj County, while the central and southern parts belong to Zadar County.

Geography

Pag belongs to the north Dalmatian archipelago and it extends northwest–southeast along the coast, forming the Velebit Channel.

The southwestern coast of the island is low (including the Pag Bay with the large Caska cove), and the northwestern is steep and high (including Stara Novalja Bay). Most of the island is rocky; smaller areas are covered with Mediterranean shrubs. The southeast of the island contains karst lakes Velo Blato and Malo Blato.

Grapes, vegetables, and fruit are grown in the valleys and fields. The northern area of the Lun peninsula is mostly under olive groves. Most communities on the island are connected by a road. A -long arch Pag Bridge connects the southern part of the island to the mainland. The Prizna–Žigljen ferry connects the northern part of the island to the mainland. The island has two towns, Pag and Novalja, and many smaller villages and communities, including Lun, Stara Novalja, Gajac, Kolan, Metajna, Dinjiška, Povljana, and others. The island is divided between two counties, with Novalja, Stara Novalja, Lun, and Metajna being part of the northern Lika-Senj County, and the remainder of the island south of an isthmus at Gajac, including the town of Pag, being part of the southern Zadar County.

History

The earliest settlers on the island were an Illyrian tribe that came to the region in the Bronze Age; traces of their settlement can still be seen around Pag. In the 1st century BC, the Romans took possession, and have left numerous archeological and cultural artifacts.

The Croats arrived in the 7th century along with the great migration and settled in the area. The island was for some time under the rule of the Croatian kingdom. Yet the island was always fought over, and in the 11th and 12th centuries was divided between the communities of Rab (Arbe) and Zadar (Zara).

From the 12th to 14th centuries, Pag, along with other Dalmatian islands and towns, was fiercely contested between the Republic of Venice and the Croatian-Hungarian rulers. For four centuries from the start of the 15th century, it was held by Venice, until Venice lost its independence in 1797. Austria and France then fought over Dalmatia with victory going to the Austrians.

The island passed from Austria-Hungary to the Kingdom of Yugoslavia after World War I, and then to the Independent State of Croatia (1941–45) when the Ustashe set up concentration camps at Slana and Metajna, where they killed thousands of Serbs, Jews, and Croatian anti-fascists.

After the Second World War it returned to Yugoslavia and, after the dissolution of Yugoslavia in 1991, the island became part of the  Republic of Croatia.

Economy
The first Croatian wind farm was constructed on Pag island, just northeast of Pag town. The 5.95 MW "Vjetroelektrana Ravna 1" wind farm is composed of seven Vestas V52 wind turbines and has operated since 2004.

Throughout its history, Pag has been connected with salt production, a traditional activity that has been practiced for more than a thousand years. While the earliest historical records of salt production on the island date to 999, it is believed salt was produced on Pag in Roman times. The origin of the town of Pag is connected with the exploitation of natural suitably shallow coves within the closed bay (the so-called Valle di Pago) for salt manufacturing.

Notable People 
Bartol Kašić (August 15, 1575 – December 28, 1650) was a Jesuit clergyman and grammarian during the Counter-Reformation, who wrote the first Croatian grammar and translated the Bible and the Roman Rite into Croatian.

See also
 Pag cheese
 Pag lace
 Pag Triangle

References

Sources
 
 

 
Islands of Croatia
Islands of the Adriatic Sea
Landforms of Lika-Senj County
Landforms of Zadar County